The Kuban steppe is one of the major steppes in Europe, located in southeastern Russia between the city of Rostov on Don and the Caucasus Mountains.  The Kuban steppe is the historic home of the Cossacks.

References
The Kuban Steppe

Plains of Russia